Grbići may refer to:

 Grbići (Sokolac), a village in Bosnia and Herzegovina
 Grbići (Trebinje), a village in Bosnia and Herzegovina